Leesville Lake  is a reservoir in Virginia used for hydroelectric power generation in conjunction with Smith Mountain Lake as a pump storage project. It is located southeast of Roanoke, and southwest of Lynchburg.

The reservoir lies in a broad valley nestled in the Blue Ridge Mountains of rural southwestern Virginia of the Appalachian chain. Before the lake's creation, farming and logging were the primary industries.

Power generation
Initial proposals were made in the late 1920s to dam the Roanoke River and the Blackwater River at the Smith Mountain gorge to generate electricity.  Construction of the Smith Mountain Dam began in 1960 and was completed in 1963.

The dam produces hydro-electric power mostly during hours of peak demand on the American Electric Power system. Water passes from Smith Mountain Lake through generators to Leesville Lake, producing power. In times of low demand, the generators are used as pumps to reverse the flow and return the water to Smith Mountain Lake.

This takes advantage of the more or less constant output of steam generation plants in off-peak periods.

Recreation and development
Since the 1960s, the area around Leesville Lake has remained relatively rural and remote with mostly corn, tobacco, small family farms and other agriculture.  The limited early residential developments around the lake consisted largely of family farms. Since about 2004, however, residential growth has begun to expand rather quickly and lakefront homes and communities now dot the shoreline. Boat traffic on the lake remains low relative to nearby Smith Mountain Lake, Kerr Lake and Lake Gaston.

Leesville Lake is becoming a popular recreational area.  Fishing is very popular, especially for striped bass. The state record striped bass was caught out of Leesville Lake in 2000.  Boating, water skiing, wakeboarding, and riding personal watercraft are also common activities.

Access to Leesville Lake is primarily by way of U.S. Route 29, although State Route 43 and State Route 40 provide access to the north and south sides of the lake, respectively.

External links
The Leesville Lake Association website
Leesville Lake VA
SML website
SML Dam website

Bodies of water of Bedford County, Virginia
Bodies of water of Pittsylvania County, Virginia
Reservoirs in Virginia
Bodies of water of Campbell County, Virginia
Roanoke River